Buddy Campbell (born May 14, 1943) is an American speed skater. He competed in the men's 1500 metres events at the 1964 Winter Olympics.

References

1943 births
Living people
American male speed skaters
Olympic speed skaters of the United States
Speed skaters at the 1964 Winter Olympics
People from Huntington, New York